Auckland City Hospital is a public hospital located in Grafton, Auckland, New Zealand. It is the largest hospital in New Zealand, as well as one of the oldest medical facilities in the country. It provides a total of 1,165 beds. It was established in 2003 as an amalgam of Auckland Hospital (acute adult care), Starship Hospital (acute children's care), Greenlane Hospital (cardio-thoracic care) and National Women's Hospital (maternity, newborn and obstetrics and gynecology). Public hospitals in Auckland have been run by Te Whatu Ora – Health New Zealand since 2022.

Importance
The emergency department alone sees about 47,000 patients annually (over 55,000 as of 2008), of which 44% are treated as in-patients. Colocated with its emergency department is the Starship Hospital children's emergency department, which sees another 30,000 patients annually, making the campus one of the busiest in Australasia.

The hospital is a research and teaching facility as well, providing training for future doctors, nurses, midwives and other health professionals. Rare or complex medical conditions from all over New Zealand may get referred here. The hospital is closely associated with Starship Children's Health, a separate subsidiary facility on the same grounds, located just to the northwest of the City Hospital. The hospital is adjacent to Auckland Medical School.

History

Previous buildings

Initially, the Auckland Hospital was housed in a timber building which occupied the Auckland City Hospital site from 1846 to 1877, providing four wards of 10 beds each, and having been designed by Frederick Thatcher, the architect of the St Mary's Church in Parnell. The hospital treated both Europeans and Māori, though the diseases were different, with the Pakeha treated mostly for the effects of alcohol abuse, while the Māori came for tuberculosis and rheuma treatment. Thomas Moore Philson was superintendent of the hospital from 1859 to 1883.

In 1877, a new building in an Italianate style was constructed for £25,000, designed by Philip Herepath, architect to the provincial government. Administered by T M Philson, the new hospital became known for taking on many charity cases but, partly in response, was also continually understaffed and overcrowded. There were also complaints about the limited training of the staff, which changed only with the hiring of a new matron, Annie Alice Crisp, in 1883. Having trained in the new tradition of Florence Nightingale, she is credited with turning the hospital from an 'old men with alcoholism institution' into a real hospital and instituting real nurse training. Her title was Lady Superintendent and she was awarded the Royal Red Cross in 1894.

Current buildings

The Herepath building was demolished in 1964 to make way for a new structure designed by architects Stephenson & Turner, which was completed in 1967, and still remains.

During the health reforms of the New Zealand health system in the early 1990s, Auckland Hospital was run as a business - in the model of state-owned enterprises of New Zealand, i.e. with the instruction to return a profit. In accordance with this policy, Auckland Hospital was officially known as Auckland Crown Health Enterprise.

The current hospital facility, opened in 2003, is an amalgam of four previously separate hospitals: Auckland Hospital (acute adult care), Starship (acute children's care), Greenlane Hospital (cardio-thoracic care) and National Women's Hospital (maternity, newborn and obstetrics and gynecology).

The hospital is situated in a NZ$180 million building which was built between 2000 and 2003. It is nine levels high (ten including plant), five levels less than the older part of the hospital, which has now become the support building. The new structure with 75,575 m2  is one of New Zealand's largest public buildings. It was designed by Jasmax in conjunction with McConnel Smith and Johnson Architects Sydney, and built by Fletcher Construction.

From 2001 until 2022, Auckland City Hospital was part of Auckland District Health Board. On 1 July 2022 Te Whatu Ora – Health New Zealand and Te Aka Whai Ora – Māori Health Authority became Aotearoa’s new national health authorities and Auckland DHB as an entity was disestablished and became part of Health New Zealand.

Facilities
The following information are excerpts from the construction company's database:

 Level 01 - Clinical record & medical waste / waste storage
 Level 02 - Children's & adults emergency departments
 Level 03 - Cardiology general and specialist wards
 Level 04 - Operating theatres (7), Hybrid operating room (1), intensive care units
 Level 05 - Radiology centre, acute stroke unit
 Level 06 - General medicine, dermatology, infectious diseases, oncology and haematology wards
 Level 07 - General surgery, trauma, orthopaedic, rheumatology, gastroenterology, urology and respiratory wards
 Level 08 - Operating theatres (13), neurology, neurosurgery wards, department of critical care medicine
 Level 09 - Operating theatres (4), pre- and postnatal care, neonatal intensive care units
 Level 10 - Plant rooms (air conditioning etc...)

The support building (old hospital) mostly contains administrative offices, clinical and housekeeping support, physio- and occupational therapy, the bone marrow transplant ward, some inpatient and outpatient services as well as teaching and research facilities. The support building is a central part of the hospital complex and is linked to the new building section by a skywalk.

See also
 List of hospitals in New Zealand
 Starship Children's Health
 Westpac Rescue Helicopter
 University of Auckland, Faculty of Medical and Health Sciences

References

External links
 Auckland City Hospital (Auckland DHB website)
 Auckland City Hospital (database entry on healthpoint.co.nz website)
 Photographs of Auckland City Hospital held in Auckland Libraries' heritage collections.

Hospital buildings completed in 1846
Hospital buildings completed in 1877
Hospital buildings completed in 1967
Hospital buildings completed in 2003
Buildings and structures in Auckland
Teaching hospitals in New Zealand
Hospitals established in 1846
Frederick Thatcher buildings
1846 establishments in New Zealand